The Beach Ultimate Lovers Association (BULA) is the worldwide organization that helps organizers and players further develop the sport of Beach Ultimate. The World Flying Disc Federation has approved BULA as the organizing body to promote tournaments, leagues and recreational play.

External links

 Beach Ultimate Lovers Association web site

See also
Beach Ultimate
Ultimate
Frisbee

Beach sports